A warning label is a label attached to a product, or contained in a product's instruction manual, warning the user about risks associated with its use, and may include restrictions by the manufacturer or seller on certain uses.  Most of them are placed to limit civil liability in lawsuits against the item's manufacturer or seller (see product liability).  That sometimes results in labels which for some people seem to state the obvious.

Government regulation
In the United States warning labels were instituted under the Federal Food, Drug, and Cosmetic Act of 1938. Cigarettes were not required to have warning labels in the United States until in 1965 Congress passed the Federal Cigarette Labeling and Advertising Act (FCLAA).

In the EEA, a product containing hazardous mixtures must have a Unique formula identifier (UFI) code. This is not a warning label per se, but a code that helps poison control centres identify the exact formula of the hazardous product.

Abnormal warning labels
Warning labels have been produced for different items.  In some cases, rumors have developed of labels warning against some very strange occurrences, such as the legendary microwave warning that allegedly states 'do not dry pets in microwave'.

Some companies hold 'strange warning label competitions' such as the former M-law wacky warning labels competition.

While many  safe products intended for human consumption may require warning labels due to the health risks associated with using them, it is only tobacco products that have strongly worded warnings on their health risks.

See also 
 Alcohol packaging warning messages
 California Proposition 65 (1986)
 Tobacco packaging warning messages
 Warning Labels for Soft Drinks
 History of warning labels in the US

References

External links

Safety
Labels